WVBS (1470 AM) was a radio station licensed to Burgaw, North Carolina, United States. It last broadcast a Christian format, as an affiliate of the Fundamental Broadcasting Network, and was last owned by Grace Christian School. The station was first licensed December 3, 1963, and held the call sign WPGF. WPGF spawned a sister station, WPGF-FM, in 1964. In 1973, the station's call sign was changed to WVBS. The station's license was cancelled January 13, 2017, after having been silent since October 12, 2015.

References

External links
FCC Station Search Details: DWVBS (Facility ID: 24711)
FCC History Cards for WVBS (covering 1961-1981 as  WPGF / WVBS)

VBS
Radio stations established in 1963
Radio stations disestablished in 2017
1963 establishments in North Carolina
2017 disestablishments in North Carolina
Defunct radio stations in the United States
Defunct religious radio stations in the United States
VBS